Larry Steven Yaeger (born 1950) is a former Apple Distinguished Scientist and Full Professor of Informatics at Indiana University Bloomington, currently employed at Google.  Outside of academia he is best known for designing the handwriting recognition software used in the Apple Newton and Inkwell. Yaeger's academic research focused on the evolution of true artificial intelligence through natural selection.  He is the lead developer of Polyworld.

References

External links
 Larry Yaeger's Homepage
 

Google employees
Apple Inc. employees
Researchers of artificial life
1950 births
Living people